Meta Štoka (born June 23, 1949) is former a Yugoslav and Slovenian female professional basketball player.

External links
Profile at fiba.com

1949 births
Living people
Basketball players from Ljubljana
Slovenian women's basketball players
Yugoslav women's basketball players